Yuen Ren Chao (3 November 1892 – 25 February 1982), also known as Zhao Yuanren, was a Chinese-American linguist, educator, scholar, poet, and composer, who contributed to the modern study of Chinese phonology and grammar.  Chao was born and raised in China, then attended university in the United States, where he earned degrees from Cornell University and Harvard University. A naturally gifted polyglot and linguist, his Mandarin Primer was one of the most widely used Mandarin Chinese textbooks in the 20th century.  He invented the Gwoyeu Romatzyh romanization scheme, which, unlike pinyin and other romanization systems, transcribes Mandarin Chinese pronunciation without diacritics or numbers to indicate tones.

Early life
Chao was born in Tianjin in 1892, though his family's ancestral home was in Changzhou, Jiangsu province. In 1910, Chao went to the United States with a Boxer Indemnity Scholarship to study mathematics and physics at Cornell University, where he was a classmate and lifelong friend of Hu Shih, the leader of the New Culture Movement. He then became interested in philosophy and in 1918 earned a PhD in philosophy from Harvard University with a dissertation entitled "Continuity: Study in Methodology".

Already in college his interests had turned to music and languages. He spoke German and French fluently and some Japanese, and he had a reading knowledge of ancient Greek and Latin. He was Bertrand Russell's interpreter when Russell visited China in 1920. In his My Linguistic Autobiography, he wrote of his ability to pick up a Chinese dialect quickly, without much effort. Chao possessed a natural gift for hearing fine distinctions in pronunciation that was said to be "legendary for its acuity", enabling him to record the sounds of various dialects with a high degree of accuracy.

Career development and later life

In 1920, he returned to China, marrying the physician Yang Buwei there that year. The ceremony was simple, as opposed to traditional weddings, attended only by Hu Shih and one other friend. Hu's account of it in the newspapers made the couple a model of modern marriage for China's New Culture generation.

Chao taught mathematics at Tsinghua University and one year later returned to the United States to teach at Harvard University. In 1925, he again returned to China, teaching at Tsinghua, and in 1926 began a survey of the Wu dialects. While at Tsinghua, Chao was considered one of the 'Four Great Teachers / Masters' of China, alongside Wang Guowei, Liang Qichao, and Chen Yinke.

He began to conduct linguistic fieldwork throughout China for the Institute of History and Philology of Academia Sinica from 1928 onwards. During this period of time, he collaborated with Luo Changpei, another leading Chinese linguist of his generation, to translate Bernhard Karlgren's Études sur la Phonologie Chinoise (published in 1940) into Chinese.

In 1938, he left for the US and resided there afterwards. In 1945, he served as president of the Linguistic Society of America, and in 1966 a special issue of the society's journal Language was dedicated to him. In 1954, he became an American citizen. In the 1950s he was among the first members of the Society for General Systems Research. From 1947 to 1960, he taught at the University of California at Berkeley, where in 1952, he became Agassiz Professor of Oriental Languages.

Both Chao and his wife Yang were known for their good senses of humor, he particularly for his love of subtle jokes and language puns: they published a family history entitled, Life with Chaos: the autobiography of a Chinese family.

Late in his life, he was invited by Deng Xiaoping to return to China in 1981.  Previously at the invitation of Premier Zhou En-Lai, Chao and his wife returned to China in 1973 for the first time since the 1940s.  He visited China again between May and June in 1981 after his wife died in March the same year. He died in Cambridge, Massachusetts. His first daughter Rulan Chao Pian (1922–2013) was Professor of East Asian Studies and Music at Harvard. His third daughter Lensey, born in 1929, is a children's book author and mathematician.

Work

When in the US in 1921, Chao recorded the Standard Chinese pronunciation gramophone records distributed nationally, as proposed by Commission on the Unification of Pronunciation.

He is the author of one of the most important standard modern works on Chinese grammar, A Grammar of Spoken Chinese (Berkeley: University of California Press, 1968), which was translated into Chinese separately by Lü Shuxiang (吕叔湘) in 1979 and by Ting Pang-hsin (丁邦新) in 1980.  It was an expansion of the grammar chapters in his earlier textbooks, Mandarin Primer and Cantonese Primer.  He was co-author of the Concise Dictionary of Spoken Chinese, which was the first dictionary to characterize Chinese characters as bound (used only in polysyllables) or free (permissible as a monosyllabic word).

General Chinese (通字) is a phonetic system he invented to represent the pronunciations of all major varieties of Chinese simultaneously. It is not specifically a romanization system, but two alternate systems: one uses Chinese characters phonetically, as a syllabary, and the other is an alphabetic romanization system with similar sound values and tone spellings to Gwoyeu Romatzyh. Chao also made a contribution to the International Phonetic Alphabet with the Chao tone letters.

When the pitch descends, the contour is called a falling tone; when it ascends, a rising tone; when it descends and then returns, a dipping or falling-rising tone; and when it ascends and then returns, it is called a peaking or rising-falling tone. A tone in a contour-tone language which remains at approximately an even pitch is called a level tone. Tones which are too short to exhibit much of a contour, typically because of a final plosive consonant, may be called checked, abrupt, clipped, or stopped tones.

His translation of Lewis Carroll's Alice's Adventures in Wonderland, where he tried his best to preserve all the word plays of the original, is considered "a classical piece of verbal art."

He also wrote The Lion-Eating Poet in the Stone Den. This Chinese text consists of 92 characters, all with the sounds shī,  shí, shǐ and shì (the diacritics indicate the four tones of Mandarin). When written out using Chinese characters the text can be understood, but it is incomprehensible when read out aloud in Standard Chinese, and therefore also incomprehensible on paper when written in romanized form. This example is often used as an argument against the romanization of Chinese.  In fact, the text was an argument against the romanization of Classical Chinese and Chao was actually for the romanization of modern vernacular written Chinese; he was one of the designers of Gwoyeu Romatzyh.

His composition How could I help thinking of her (教我如何不想她 jiāo wǒ rúhé bù xiǎng tā) was a "pop hit" in the 1930s in China. The lyrics are by Liu Bannong, another linguist.

Chao translated Jabberwocky into Chinese by inventing characters to imitate what Rob Gifford describes as the "slithy toves that gyred and gimbled in the wabe of Carroll's original."

Mrs. Chao published How to Cook and Eat in Chinese in 1946, and the book went through many editions. Their daughter Rulan wrote the English text and Mr. Chao developmentally edited the text based on Mrs. Chao's developed recipes, as well as her experiences gathering recipes in various areas of China. Among the three of them, they coined the terms "pot sticker" and "stir fry" for the book, terms which are now widely accepted, and the recipes popularized various related techniques. His presentation of his wife's recipe for “Stirred Eggs” (Chapter 13) is a classic of American comic writing.

Selected works
(with Yang Lien-sheng) Concise Dictionary of Spoken Chinese (1947). Cambridge, Massachusetts: Harvard University Press.
Cantonese Primer (1947). Cambridge, Massachusetts: Harvard University Press.
Mandarin Primer (1948). Cambridge, Massachusetts: Harvard University Press.
Grammar of Spoken Chinese (1965). Berkeley: University of California Press.

References

Notes and Further reading
 Chao, Yuen Ren, "My Linguistic Autobiography", in Aspects of Chinese Sociolinguistics: Essays by Yuen Ren Chao, pp. 1–20, selected and introduced by Anwar S. Dil, Stanford: Stanford University Press, 1976. also in 
 
 
 陳嘉映：〈語言學大師趙元任〉（2009）[Chen Jiaying: 'Linguist Master Zhao Yuanren' (2009)]

External links

Chinese linguist, phonologist, composer and author, Yuen Ren Chao, interview conducted by Rosemany Levenson, Bancroft Library
 Chao's gallery, with related essays, at  Tsinghua's site
 Biography at Guoxue

1892 births
1982 deaths
Chinese male composers
Republic of China (1912–1949) emigrants to the United States
Linguists from China
American writers of Chinese descent
Republic of China translators
English–Chinese translators
Chinese–English translators
Chinese non-fiction writers
Cornell University alumni
Chinese phonologists
Chinese sinologists
University of California, Berkeley College of Letters and Science faculty
Academic staff of Tsinghua University
Harvard University faculty
Harvard Graduate School of Arts and Sciences alumni
Cornell University faculty
Academic staff of the National Southwestern Associated University
Boxer Indemnity Scholarship recipients
Members of Academia Sinica
Writers from Tianjin
Educators from Tianjin
Musicians from Tianjin
Republic of China musicians
Scientists from Tianjin
20th-century Chinese translators
Chinese composers
20th-century composers
Linguistic Society of America presidents
Linguists of Chinese
20th-century linguists
Corresponding Fellows of the British Academy
20th-century male musicians